Dilashaini (Nepali: डिलाशैनी ) is a Gaupalika(Nepali: गाउपालिका ; gaupalika) in Baitadi District in the Sudurpashchim Province of far-western Nepal. 
Dilashaini has a population of 22924.The land area is 125.28 km2.

This municipality was made by merging Kotpetara, Rudrakchyar, Mathaiiraj, Dilasaini and Gokuleshwor VDCs.

References

Rural municipalities in Baitadi District
Populated places in Baitadi District
Rural municipalities of Nepal established in 2017